Kłaŭdziy Stsiapanavich Duzh-Dusheŭski (27 March 1891 – 25 February 1959) was a Belarusian civil engineer, architect, diplomat and journalist. He is believed to be the creator of the Flag of Belarus in 1917.

Life 
Duzh-Dusheŭski was born into an impoverished family of the Lithuanian nobility. In 1912 he graduated the Vilna non-classical secondary school where he had joined the Belarusian national movement. In 1912–1918 Duzh-Dusheŭski studied in the Saint Petersburg Mining Institute. Being in St. Petersburg, he also took part in Belarusian social life. For instance, he was editor of the Belarusian magazine Ranica.

In 1917 he joined the Belarusian Socialist Assembly. In 1918 he worked at the Refugee Assistance Department of the Belarusian National Committee in St. Petersburg. At that time, according to his own memories, he created the draft of the white-red-white Flag of Belarus that was very quickly adopted by the Belarusian national movement throughout the European part of the former Russian Empire and later adopted as the state flag of the Belarusian Democratic Republic.

In 1919 Duzh-Dusheŭski moved to Vilna. In autumn 1919 he was appointed diplomatic representative of the Belarusian Democratic Republic in the Baltic states. In early 1921 Duzh-Dusheŭski was arrested by Polish authorities.

After that he emigrated to Lithuania and settled in Kaunas. In the 1920s–1930s he worked for several ministries there. In 1927 he graduated from the University of Lithuania in Kaunas as Civil Engineer. Duzh-Dusheŭski also edited several Belarusian newspapers in Lithuania.

In 1940 Duzh-Dusheŭski was arrested by the Soviets who had occupied Lithuania. In August 1943 he was arrested by the Nazis for hiding Jews. He was put into the Pravieniškės death camp. On April 13, 2004, Duzh-Dusheŭski because of the salvation of Jews was posthumously awarded the Cross of Rescue of the Perishing by the President of Lithuania. This happened at the request of the Jewish community of Lithuania.

In 1944–1946 Kłaŭdziy Duzh-Dusheŭski worked at the Kaunas University.

In 1952 Duzh-Dusheŭski was arrested and sentenced to 25 years of concentration camps for being an "active Belarusian nationalist". He was freed in 1955 and has worked for an architectural institute.

References

External links
 Arche, Дзяржаўная сымболіка Беларускай Народнай Рэспублікі
 Nasha Niva, Клаўдзі Дуж-Душэўскі. Сьцяг
 RFE/RL, Імёны Свабоды. Клаўдзі Дуж-Душэўскі

1959 deaths
1891 births
Belarusian architects
Belarusian diplomats
Belarusian journalists
Belarusian nationalists
Lithuanian architects
Lithuanian people of Belarusian descent
Engineers from Kaunas
Vytautas Magnus University alumni
Flag designers
Belarusian civil engineers
20th-century journalists
People who rescued Jews during the Holocaust
Burials at Petrašiūnai Cemetery